The Women's heptathlon at the 2014 Commonwealth Games as part of the athletics programme was held at Hampden Park on 29 and 30 July 2014.

Results

References

Women's heptathlon
2014
2014 in women's athletics